Robert Cornish may refer to:

Robert E. Cornish (1903–1963), child prodigy, who gained fame for his work attempting to resuscitate the dead
Robert Kestell Kestell-Cornish (1824–1909), first Bishop of Madagascar, 1874–1896
William Robert Cornish (also W. R. Cornish, 1828–1896), British physician who served in India